AT&T Mexico (formerly known as Iusacell and Nextel Mexico), also known as AT&T Mexico Wireless and AT&T Mexico Mobility, is a Mexican mobile telephone operator and subsidiary of AT&T. AT&T Mexico is headquartered in Mexico City. Its mobile network is available in 90% of Mexico, serving 13% of the Mexican wireless market. AT&T is the third-largest wireless carrier in Mexico, with 20.362 million subscribers as of December 2021.

Services
The company provides cellular services reaching about 90% of Mexico's population. The company also offers local and long-distance telephony, messaging services, mobile television and wireless broadband services.

History 
AT&T Mexico was originally Iusacell prior to its acquisition by AT&T.

Bell Atlantic (now Verizon Communications) and Vodafone Group together acquired 74.5% of the company in 2001 from the Peralta family, which founded Iusacell in 1987. But following Iusacell's default on debts, the two companies in 2003 sold their stake to Ricardo Salinas Pliego's Movil@ccess in a deal valued at $7.4 billion.

Movil@ccess tender offer
In June 2003 a Movil@ccess (Movilaccess) of Grupo Salinas, extended a tender offer to purchase the control of Grupo Iusacell's stock, by the time Grupo Salinas already own a mobile phone company, Unefon, but the other major stock holder of Unefon, Grupo Saba, disagreed in the purchase of Iusacell because of the debt and low profit problems. The former controlling shareholders of Grupo Iusacell (BMV: CEL: Latibex: XCEL), Verizon and Vodafone, agreed to tender the entirety of their stock, which resulted in the acquisition of a majority interest by Grupo Salinas.

Merger with Unefon
In March 2007, Grupo Salinas  announced its intention to merge its subsidiaries Iusacell with Unefon Holdings. Unefon was a wireless telephony operator focused on Mexico's mass market.

The resulting company had over 3.4 million subscribers, equivalent to approximately 7% of the wireless telecommunications market in Mexico.

The combined Iusacell and Unefon was the first wireless cellular service provider in the country with a third-generation platform (3G CDMA EVDO) that gave users access to a wide range of other telecommunications services and multimedia applications, making the mobile network an efficient vehicle for data transmission and value added services besides voice.

On November 15, 2010 Iusacell launched their HSPA+ network with speeds up to 21 Mbit/s. Similar to U.S. carrier T-Mobile US, it branded its HSPA+ network as "4G."

However, on Wednesday, January 25, 2012, Cofetel temporarily refused to approve a merger between Televisa and Iusacell, with three votes against, for illegal damage to third parties and hindering competition for open and pay television. This refusal continued until 2012 with Televisa and TV Azteca against Grupo Carso. Eventually, the merger was accepted with different conditions, among which allowing any company advertising time without condition, prohibiting the staff of Grupo Televisa and Grupo Salinas from hindering a developing third television network, and if not achieved within two years, dismantle the merge. With 8.2 million users at the time, the company also offered local and long-distance service, as well as wireless and fiber optic Internet. Fiber is available only in some neighborhoods of Mexico City and the states of Jalisco and Nuevo León. These services are offered under the brand Iusatel, messaging services (SMS, MMS, and email), mobile TV and mobile broadband (with your brand BAM). On Friday November 7, 2014 the US company AT&T announced the acquisition of Iusacell for 2.5 billion, including debt.

In September 2014, it was announced that Grupo Salinas would acquire Televisa's 50 percent stake in Iusacell for a fee of $717 million. On January 8, 2015, Grupo Televisa announced that the sale of its 50 percent stake had been completed.

Merger of Iusacell and Nextel into AT&T

In November 2014, AT&T announced it would acquire the Mexican wireless company Iusacell for US$2.5 billion from Grupo Salinas. The price includes $800 million in debt. Under the terms of the agreement, AT&T would acquire all of Iusacell wireless properties, including licenses, network assets, retail stores and approximately 8.6 million subscribers. The purchase was completed on January 16, 2015. On January 30, 2015, AT&T announced the purchase of Nextel Mexico for $1.875 billion from NII Holdings, excluding financial debts. The transaction was completed and approved by the Federal Telecommunications Institute in Mexico and the Bankruptcy Court District of New York in US on April 30, 2015. AT&T launched several new plans on August 24, 2015 under the AT&T brand and began renaming Iusacell and Nextel stores in a process that was completed by the end of 2016. AT&T invested an additional $3 billion in Mexico through 2018 to expand its high-speed mobile broadband `coverage to 100 million people, The company currently holds the largest amount of spectrum in the country. While gradually moving the Nextel and Iusacell brands to AT&T premium services, AT&T intended to keep the Unefon brand, which was part of Iusacell, for low-end prepaid users.

On December 10, 2021, AT&T Mexico announced it intended to launch its 5G NR network using its 2.5 GHz spectrum, making it the first mobile network operator in the country to build out an NR network.

Network 
AT&T Mexico currently operates a 3G UMTS, and 4G LTE, while it is currently testing a 5G NR network. It shut down its CDMA network on October 3, 2016, its IDEN network in 2017 and its GSM network in 2019.

Radio frequency spectrum chart 

The following is a list of known frequencies that AT&T Mexico owns and uses on its network.

See also
 AT&T Inc., parent company
 AT&T Mobility, United States wireless service provider owned by parent company
 Sky México, television provider partially owned by AT&T
 Telcel, largest competitor
 Movistar, competitor
 Unefón, prepaid arm of AT&T Mexico

References

Sources
 Iusacell at hoovers.com

External links
 

Companies based in Mexico City
Companies listed on the Mexican Stock Exchange
Companies formerly listed on the New York Stock Exchange
AT&T subsidiaries
Telecommunications companies of Mexico
Mexican companies established in 1987
Telecommunications companies established in 1987
Mexican subsidiaries of foreign companies
2015 mergers and acquisitions